Farlinville is an unincorporated community in Linn County, Kansas, United States.

History
Farlinville had a post office from the 1860s until 1917.

References

Further reading

External links
 Linn County maps: Current, Historic, KDOT

Unincorporated communities in Linn County, Kansas
Unincorporated communities in Kansas